Mohammad Nosrati (born 11 January 1982) is an Iranian football coach and former player. He is the current head coach of the Pars Jonoubi Jam team in the Azadegan League. Mohammad Nosrati is a former player of the Iranian national football team and has played in the 2006 World Cup. He is a member of club teams, Tehran Pass, Persepolis, Al-Nasr, Traktor, Peykan, Gostaresh foolad, Naft Tehran،mashin sazi ،Iran's national team goal scorer against Bahrain and promotion to the 2006 World Cup،And has a record of winning the 2002 Asian Under-23 Games in Busan

Club career

Pas Tehran
Nosrati started his career at Aboomoslem, he left the club to join PAS in 2001. He was one of many valuable players of Pas Tehran, finishing the 2003–04 season as Iran Pro League champions.
There had been some notable interest shown in him from outside Iran—most notably he was officially linked to 2003 Croatian champions, Dinamo Zagreb, but rejected the offer citing that he wanted to play in a better European league. He dispelled speculation of which European team he would sign with when he signed a three-year extension with Pas in 2005. He also played in AFC Champions League for Pas. After Pas Tehran was disqualified, Nosrati left the club and did not join the newly formed Pas Hamedan.

Persepolis
On February 9, 2007 it was said Nosrati signed with Belgian League outfit R.E. Mouscron on a 5-month contract after a successful trial and passing medical tests, however the deal was not completed as terms and conditions could not be agreed on.
He moved to Persepolis in August 2007 and won the league in his first and only season.

Al-Nasr and Tractor
In 2008, he moved to Al-Nasr in the United Arab Emirates and joined Luka Bonačić's team. He played in most of the matches for Al-Nasr but it was reported that he was unhappy in the United Arab Emirates and wanted to move back to Persepolis. He finally joined newly promoted Iran Pro League club Tractor. Nosrati moved back to his old club in the UAE Al-Nasr in late January 2010. He moved back to Tractor in summer of 2010 and stayed there for a season.

Persepolis
He signed a contract with Persepolis on 27 June 2011. He was indefinitely suspended by the Iranian football federation  for "immoral acts" after he squeezed his teammate Sheis Rezaei's buttocks during a goal celebration. His suspension was come to end on 26 December 2011. After his suspension he became the regular player for the team again but was named in transfer list after the end of the season and was transfer to his former club Tractor.

Tractor
At Tractor he was one of the key players of the team which became the runners-up in the league for the first time in the club's history. He also helped the club win the Hazfi Cup in his second season at the club.

Paykan
On 19 June 2014, Nosrati joined Paykan.

Club career statistics

 Assist Goals

International career
Nosrati made his debut for Iran in 2002 in a game against Jordan and since that moment has had a somewhat stable role in the squad. Already labeled a talented youngster before that debut, he has consistently made a balanced and overall good impression. After being one of the Asian Games 2002 gold medal winners, he was marked as a fixed defender in the national team despite being only 20 years old at the time. He was in Iran's squad in 2004 Asian Cup and scored an important goal against Oman in group stages in 92nd minute. He also won the 2004 West Asian Football Federation Championship with Team Melli.

He was among Iran's final squad for World Cup 2006.
He also played in 2007 AFC Asian Cup qualification and after a long injury played in 2007 Asian Cup. He played in 2010 FIFA World Cup qualification and 2014 FIFA World Cup qualification for Team Melli. He continued to be one of the regular players in 2011 AFC Asian Cup qualification. He played in West Asian Football Federation Championship 2010 and 2011 Asian Cup.

International caps

International goals
Scores and results list Iran's goal tally first.

Managerial statistics

Honours
Pas Tehran
Iran Pro League (1): 2002–03 (Runner-up), 2003–04, 2005–06 (Runner-up)

Persepolis
Iran Pro League (1): 2007–08

Tractor
Iran Pro League: 2012–13 (Runner-up)
Hazfi Cup (1): 2013–14

Country
 Asian Games Gold Medal (1): 2002
West Asian Football Federation Championship (1): 2004
AFC/OFC Cup Challenge (1): 2003

References

External links

 Mohammad Nosrati at PersianLeague.com
 
 

 RSSSF archive of Ali Karimi's international appearances
 
 
 
 Mohammad Nosrati at FFIRI.IR 
 Mohammad Nosrati at FIFA.com
 Mohammad Nosrati   at footballcritic.com 
 Mohammad Nosrati  at metafootball.com
 

1981 births
Living people
Iranian footballers
Association football defenders
Iran international footballers
Iranian expatriate footballers
2004 AFC Asian Cup players
2006 FIFA World Cup players
2007 AFC Asian Cup players
2011 AFC Asian Cup players
Pas players
People from Karaj
Persian Gulf Pro League players
Azadegan League players
Persepolis F.C. players
Keshavarz players
Tractor S.C. players
Asian Games gold medalists for Iran
F.C. Aboomoslem players
Paykan F.C. players
UAE Pro League players
Al-Nasr SC (Dubai) players
Asian Games medalists in football
Footballers at the 2002 Asian Games
Gostaresh Foulad F.C. players
Machine Sazi F.C. players
Medalists at the 2002 Asian Games
21st-century Iranian people